The 1993 Abierto Mexicano, also known by its sponsored name Abierto Mexicano Telcel, was a men's tennis tournament held at the Club Alemán in Mexico City, Mexico that was part of the ATP World Series of the 1993 ATP Tour. It was the inaugural edition of the tournament and was held from 22 February through 28 February 1993. Second-seeded Thomas Muster won the singles title.

Finals

Singles

 Thomas Muster defeated  Carlos Costa 6–2, 6–4
 It was Muster 1st singles title of the year and the 14th of his career.

Doubles

 Leonardo Lavalle /  Jaime Oncins defeated  Horacio de la Peña /  Jorge Lozano 7–6, 6–4

References

External links
 ITF tournament edition details

Abierto Mexicano Telcel
Mexican Open (tennis)
1993 in Mexican tennis